Georgy Ivanovich Rerberg (September 28, 1937, Moscow, Soviet Union, – July 28, 1999, Moscow, Russia) was a Soviet cinematographer.

He is known for his work on Andrey Tarkovsky's Mirror  He started as cinematographer on Andrey Tarkovsky's film Stalker but was later replaced with Alexander Knyazhinsky.

Rerberg's notable portfolio of two dozen films includes works with world-renowned Russian film directors Andrei Konchalovsky, Andrei Tarkovsky, Igor Talankin, Sergei Solovyov, Ivan Dykhovichny, Abderrahmane Sissako and others. 

Georgy Rerberg was grandson of Russian civil engineer and architect Ivan Rerberg.

Selected filmography
The Story of Asya Klyachina (1960)
The First Teacher (1965)
A Nest of Gentry (1969)
Uncle Vanya (1970)
Ilf and Petrov Rode a Tram (1972)
The Mirror (1975)
Melodies of a White Night (1976)
Father Sergius (1978)
Stalker (1979)
Time for Rest from Saturday to Monday (1984)
Plumbum, or The Dangerous Game (1987)
Octobre (1993)

References

External links
 
 Георгий Рерберг. «Если чувства не воспитаны, толку не будет». Последняя беседа.  
 Георгий Рерберг — Марианна Чугунова — Евгений Цымбал. Фокус на бесконечность. Разговор о «Сталкере» (1997). Iskusstvo kino 2006, #4.

Soviet people of Danish descent
Soviet cinematographers
Russian cinematographers
Mass media people from Moscow
1937 births
1999 deaths
People's Artists of the RSFSR
Recipients of the Vasilyev Brothers State Prize of the RSFSR
Gerasimov Institute of Cinematography alumni